Tribe Gaming (TRB) is a North American mobile gaming esports and entertainment organization headquartered in Austin, Texas. Founded in 2017,
Tribe currently fields professional teams across multiple mobile video game titles including: Clash Royale, Clash of Clans, Brawl Stars, and Call of Duty: Mobile. These teams are based in North America and Europe but compete globally. In addition to esports, Tribe creates unique entertainment featuring a diverse roster of mobile gaming content creators. The members of Tribe Gaming are as follows: MOLT, Orange Juice Gaming, BenTimm1, Lex - Brawl Stars, KairosTime Gaming, Rey - Brawl Stars, Natwithaheart, Tom - Brawl Stars, and Cori - Brawl Stars.

History

2017 
In April,  Tribe Gaming was announced as a mobile gaming esports organization, initially fielding a competitive Vainglory team. After a subpar entrance into the competitive scene, the organization acquired the Vainglory roster of Immortals, consisting of DNZio, MaxGreen, ttigers, and Xelciar. As a heavy underdog, the team won the 2017 Vainglory World Championship and $70,000 first place prize at the Kallang Theatre in Singapore, beating the likes of Cloud9 and G2 Esports.

2018 
In April, the organization was accepted into the North American Clash Royale League as the sole mobile gaming esports organization. Later that year, Tribe Gaming became the first mobile gaming esports organization to bring on board a smartphone partner and gaming chair partner, brokering deals with Razer and Secretlab respectively.

2019 
In March, Tribe Gaming's Vainglory team repeated as World Champions at the Chongqing Olympic Sports Center in Chongqing, China, defeating Team ACE 2–0 in the finals. Tribe Gaming expanded by adding two additional game divisions in 2019, fielding new rosters in Clash of Clans and PUBG: Mobile.

Tribe Gaming's Clash of Clans team finished in 4th place at the 2019 Clash of Clans World Championship, taking home US$50,000. Tribe Gaming's Brawl Stars team, consisting of Jack Chepo, Cryingman, and Slash, finished in 3rd/4th place at the 2019 Brawl Stars World Finals, taking home $25,000.

2020 
In January, Tribe Gaming entered Brawl Stars by signing the 2019 World Championship team of Cerulean, Tom, and SpenLC. Cerulean left in Spring 2020 and was replaced by Symantec.

In March, Tribe Gaming announced a financing round of $1M from an investment group that included the likes of Gordon Hayward and Cesaro.

After Tribe Gaming's European Brawl Stars team(Symantec, Tom, and SpenLC) did not qualify for the world championships, Tribe decided to sign the North American Champions, Cori, Zoulan, and Tyrant Star. Tribe Gaming's North American Brawl Stars team finished in 3rd/4th place at the 2020 Brawl Stars World Finals in November, winning a total of US$125,000.

2021 
Tribe's European team's roster expired and they chose not to resign. On 27 February, Raz joined the NA Tribe Gaming team as a fourth player.  Symantec left to join SK Gaming and Tom and SpenLC joined KC and Drage and played as free agents under the name Tea Drinkers for a few months. Drage took the role of coach as he was not yet 16 years of age. In April, however, they rejoined Tribe Gaming. At the end of the 2021 competitive brawl stars season, both the European and North American teams ended up qualifying for the Brawl Stars World Finals that took place in Bucharest, Romania.
In the 2021 Clash of Clans World Championship, Tribe took 3rd place out of 8 teams and earned $100,000.

2022 
In 21 January, Spencer Hendley, known professionally as SpenLC, retired from playing Brawl Stars competitively and left the roster of Tribe Gaming EU. He continues to upload videos on his two Youtube channels.

Management

Current rosters

Content creators

Brawl Stars EU

Brawl Stars NA

References

External links 

Esports teams based in the United States
Vainglory (video game) teams
Esports teams established in 2017